Kościuszkowców Street is located in the Wawer district of Warsaw, Poland. It connects Korkowa Street with Bronisława Czecha Street, which is also part of the national road 2. Its east side borders with King Jan Sobieski Reserve.

Close to the street there's Church of St. Felix of Cantalice, and from its tower Adolf Hitler observed occupation of Warsaw on September 15, 1939.

There are public transport lines running, including 115, 305 and night line N25.

References 

Streets in Warsaw